Koen van de Laak (born 3 September 1982) is a Dutch former professional footballer. He played for Den Bosch, Groningen and Ajax Cape Town in South Africa.

Career

Den Bosch
Born in Vught, Koen van de Laak started to play for a local club named Zwaluw VFC in 1988 when he was six years old. He moved to FC Den Bosch in 1994. After spending six years in the youth team, he made his debut in the first squad of Den Bosch on 4 November 2000. In this game he scored two times against Helmond Sport. That year his team promoted to the Dutch Eredivisie.

Groningen
After playing some good seasons at Den Bosch and being top scorer several times, he opted to move to another team. He had several clubs to choose from but Groningen signed him for four years. In the first year playing for Groningen they ended up fifth in the league and managed to qualify for the UEFA Cup for the 2006–07 season. He quickly adjusted at Groningen, soon becoming a very important player and a fan favourite under the tenure of Ron Jans.

In the 2009–10 season, he became the captain of the team. Groningen managed to qualify twice for the Europe League which was unique in the history of Groningen. In December 2010, he picked up a knee injury in a match against Vitesse which kept him off the pitch till January 2012; despite that, his club agreed to extend his contract by one more year (from June 2011 to June 2012).

On 29 March 2012, it was revealed Van de Laak would leave Groningen at the end of the season, once his contract expired.

Ajax Cape Town
On 15 June 2012, Van de Laak signed with Ajax Cape Town from South Africa, playing in the Premier Soccer League for two seasons before parting ways with the Cape club.

Career statistics

References

External links
 Profile van de Laak

Living people
1982 births
People from Vught
Association football midfielders
Dutch footballers
Dutch expatriate footballers
Eredivisie players
Eerste Divisie players
FC Groningen players
FC Den Bosch players
Cape Town Spurs F.C. players
Dutch expatriate sportspeople in South Africa
Expatriate soccer players in South Africa
Netherlands under-21 international footballers
South African Premier Division players